The Bat Yam Municipal Stadium (HaEtztadion HaIroni Bat Yam) is a football stadium in the Tel Aviv District city of Bat Yam, Israel. It has a capacity of 3,100.

Opened in 1991, the stadium is located in the south-east of Bat Yam, and replaced the former municipal stadium that was in the south-west. It was host to Beitar Bat Yam, Maccabi Bat Yam, and later, Maccabi Ironi Bat Yam and Hapoel Bat Yam, all of which are now defunct.

Football venues in Israel
Sports venues in Tel Aviv District
Sport in Bat Yam